Antoinette Bouzonnet-Stella was a French engraver.

Life
She was born at Lyons in about 1641, the daughter of Étienne Bouzonnet, a goldsmith, and his wife, Madeleine Stella (sister of the artist Jacques Stella). Her siblings included Antoine and Claudine Bouzonnet-Stella.

According to  Joseph Strutt: She made more use of the point than her sister [i.e. Claudine], and etched  in a very powerful style. She harmonized the roughness, left by the aqua-fortis, with the graver, in such a manner as to produce a pleasing effect. She drew correctly, especially the extremities of the human figure, which she expressed with great taste.

She died in Paris at the age of 35 in 1676, having suffered a fall. A third sister, Françoise, was also an engraver.

Works
Her works include:
 Romulus and Remus suckled by a Wolf; after Antoine Bouzonnet Stella.
 The Entry of the Emperor Sigismund into Mantua; after a stucco frieze by Giulio Romano.

References

Sources
 

French women printmakers
17th-century French engravers
1630s births
1676 deaths
Engravers from Lyon
17th-century French women artists
Women engravers
Accidental deaths from falls
Accidental deaths in France